This article displays the qualifying draw of the 2011 PTT Pattaya Open.

Players

Seeds

Qualifiers

Qualifying draw

First qualifier

Second qualifier

Third qualifier

Fourth qualifier

References
 Qualifying Draw

Singles Qualifying
PTT Pattaya Open - Singles Qualifying
 in women's tennis